They Call It Murder is a 1971 American television film directed by Walter Grauman and starring Jim Hutton.

Production
They Call It Murder is a two-hour television film produced by Paisano Productions in association with 20th Century Fox. It was a pilot for a proposed TV movie series based on characters created by Erle Stanley Gardner, who edited the script by Sam Rolfe. Walter Grauman directed; Cornwell Jackson was executive producer. The film is loosely based on Gardner's 1939 novel, The D.A. Draws a Circle.

The film went into production in 1969 and was completed February 9, 1970. Jim Hutton stars as Doug Selby, district attorney of a small town outside Los Angeles.

They Call It Murder was first presented December 17, 1971, on NBC. Gardner had died by the time the film finally was given its world premiere. Paisano Productions had worked to launch a Doug Selby series for six years, while its series Perry Mason was in its prime. No series materialized, and this TV movie marks Selby's sole screen adaptation.

Cast
 Jim Hutton as Doug Selby, D.A.
 Lloyd Bochner as A.B. Carr
 Jo Ann Pflug as Sylvia Martin
 Robert J. Wilke as Sheriff Rex Brandon
 Edward Asner as Chief Otto Larkin
 Bill Elliott as Deputy Bob Terry 
 Míriam Colón as Anita Nogales
 Jessica Walter as Jane Antrim
 Carmen Mathews as Doris Kane
 Leslie Nielsen as Frank Antrim

References

External links
 
 Free Classic Movies: They Call It Murder

1971 television films
1971 films
Erle Stanley Gardner
American television films
Films directed by Walter Grauman
1970s English-language films
20th Century Fox Television films